The Europe and Africa Zone is one of the three zones of the regional Davis Cup competition in 2014.

In the Europe and Africa Zone there are four different groups in which teams compete against each other to advance to the next group. Winners in Group I advance to the World Group Play-offs, along with losing teams from the World Group first round. Teams who lose their respective ties will compete in the relegation play-offs, with winning teams remaining in Group I, whereas teams who lose their play-offs will be relegated to the Europe/Africa Group II in 2015.

Participating teams

Seeds:

Remaining nations:

Draw
All seeded teams get a bye into the second round.

 and   relegated to Group II in 2015.

First round

Russia vs. Poland

Portugal vs. Slovenia

Ukraine vs. Romania

Slovakia vs. Latvia

Second round

Poland vs. Croatia

Slovenia vs. Israel

Sweden vs. Ukraine

Slovakia vs. Austria

First round play-offs

Romania vs. Sweden

Latvia vs. Austria

Second round play-offs

Russia vs. Portugal

Sweden vs. Latvia

References

Euro Africa Zone I
Davis Cup Europe/Africa Zone